Norris is a city in Anderson County, Tennessee, United States. Its population was 1,599 at the 2020 census. It is included in the Knoxville, Tennessee Metropolitan Statistical Area.

Norris was built as a model planned community by the Tennessee Valley Authority (TVA) in 1933 to house workers building Norris Dam on the Clinch River. It is named in honor of Nebraska Senator George W. Norris, a long-term supporter of the TVA.

History

TVA chairman Arthur Morgan envisioned Norris as a model of cooperative, egalitarian living. The city design was developed by TVA staff, who loosely based their design on the English garden city movement of the 1890s. Winding roads followed the contour of the terrain.  Houses did not always face the street. A central common green and a belt of rural land around the town were reserved for use by residents. The houses, which were some of the first all-electric homes, were built using local wood and stone, according to twelve basic house designs that each included a porch and fireplace. Different exterior materials were used for visual variety.

Norris represents the first use of greenbelt design principles in a self-contained town in the United States. The town was the first in Tennessee to have a complete system of dial telephones. Norris Creamery was the first milk-producing plant in the world to be powered solely by electricity.

During the 1930s, TVA officials excluded black families from the city, effectively making it a sundown town, purportedly to conform to the customs and traditions of the area. However, black leaders said that poor whites and blacks had lived and worked together in the area long before the TVA came into existence. The National Association for the Advancement of Colored People (NAACP) complained repeatedly (in 1934, 1935 and 1938) about racial discrimination by the TVA in the hiring, housing and training of blacks.

In 1948 the U.S. Congress directed that the city be sold at public auction. It was purchased for 2.1 million by a Philadelphia investment group headed by Henry D. Epstein, which then sold individual homes to their residents.  The city was officially incorporated in 1949. In 1953 the Epstein group sold its remaining Norris real estate to a corporation formed by Norris residents and known as the Norris Corporation.

Today Norris primarily serves as a bedroom community for Knoxville and Oak Ridge. Services available within the community include one elementary school serving grades K-5, one middle school serving grades 6–8, a small grocer, and many other small businesses. The community's high school students attend Anderson County High School.

The Museum of Appalachia, founded by John Rice Irwin, is a popular attraction in Norris. Norris is a short distance from Norris Dam State Park, part of which is in the city, and Big Ridge State Park, which include popular camping areas.

Geography
Norris is located in northern Anderson County at  (36.199515, −84.069077), on a set of hills south of the Clinch River. U.S. Route 441, the Norris Freeway, arcs around the west side of the city, leading south  to Knoxville and northwest  to Rocky Top. Interstate 75 passes  to the southwest of the city, with access via Tennessee State Route 61 from Exit 122.

Climate

Demographics

2020 census

As of the 2020 United States census, there were 1,601 people, 585 households, and 330 families residing in the city.

2010 census
As of the census of 2010, there were 1,491 people living in the city.

2000 census
Statistics based on the 2000 census are: the population density was 210.6 people per square mile (81.3/km2). There were 682 housing units at an average density of 99.3 per square mile (38.3/km2). The racial makeup of the city was 98.41% White, 0.21% African American, 0.48% Native American, 0.14% Asian, 0.21% from other races, and 0.55% from two or more races. Hispanic or Latino of any race were 0.55% of the population.

There were 644 households, out of which 29.2% had children under the age of 18 living with them, 54.8% were married couples living together, 8.7% had a female householder with no husband present, and 33.7% were non-families. 31.8% of all households were made up of individuals, and 16.9% had someone living alone who was 65 years of age or older. The average household size was 2.25 and the average family size was 2.83.

In the city, the population was spread out, with 23.2% under the age of 18, 5.0% from 18 to 24, 24.5% from 25 to 44, 28.1% from 45 to 64, and 19.2% who were 65 years of age or older. The median age was 43 years. For every 100 females, there were 88.0 males. For every 100 females age 18 and over, there were 79.3 males.

The median income for a household in the city was 47,105, and the median income for a family was 55,179. Males had a median income of 41,813 versus 27,727 for females. The per capita income for the city was 29,832. About 0.7% of families and 4.7% of the population were below the poverty line, including 6.1% of those under age 18 and 6.5% of those age 65 or over.

Government
The government of Norris is vested in a mayor, a vice-mayor, and a three-member city council. As of December 10, 2018, the current mayor of Norris is Chris Mitchell and the vice-mayor is Larry Beeman. The council members are Bill Grieve, Ron Hill, and Loretta Painter.
 
The original city hall was located in the Norris Community Building, along with the town library and the multi-purpose auditorium/gymnasium on Ridgeway Drive until 1978, when it was destroyed by a fire. The cause was never determined. The city hall then moved to a location on Chestnut Drive, but this location was destroyed in a fire in 2002. The facility on Chestnut Drive was reconstructed and continues to serve as a City Office and Community Building. The Norris Public Safety Department is located at 9 West Circle Road.

The city of Norris also helps fund a public library. The library has about 20,000 materials in its collection and is located in the McNeeley Municipal Building.

References

External links

 
 Municipal Technical Advisory Service entry for Norris — information on local government, elections, and link to charter
 

Cities in Anderson County, Tennessee
Cities in Tennessee
Historic districts on the National Register of Historic Places in Tennessee
Knoxville metropolitan area
Planned cities in the United States
Populated places established in 1933
Tennessee Valley Authority
Company towns in Tennessee
1933 establishments in Tennessee
National Register of Historic Places in Anderson County, Tennessee
Sundown towns in Tennessee
Utopian communities in the United States